Gonzalo Giribet is a Spanish-American invertebrate zoologist and Alexander Agassiz Professor of zoology working on systematics and biogeography at the Museum of Comparative Zoology in Harvard University. He is a past president of the International Society for Invertebrate Morphology, of the Willi Hennig Society, and vice-president of the Sociedad Española de Malacología (Spanish Malacological Society).

Early life
Giribet was born in Burgos and grew up in Vilanova i la Geltrú, Catalonia to a legal administrator and an engineer who worked in nuclear power plants. As a boy, he enjoyed windsurfing, beachcombing, and collecting sea shells. He attended, and then graduated from, the University of Barcelona in 1993, with bachelor's degrees in zoology and fundamental biology. He completed his doctorate in animal biology in 1997. He then moved to the American Museum of Natural History for postdoctoral research with Ward Wheeler, and from there moved to Harvard University in 2000, where he went through the ranks until becoming full professor in 2007, Alexander Agassiz Professor of Zoology in 2013, and Harvard College Professor in 2017.

Career
Giribet is a Fellow of the Linnean Society of London; a Fellow of the California Academy of Sciences, San Francisco; a research associate at the American Museum of Natural History, New York; a research associate at the Field Museum of Natural History, Chicago; and an honorary research fellow at The Natural History Museum, London. Since 2014 he is Foreign Member of the biology section of the Institut d'Estudis Catalans, Barcelona. In 2017 Giribet received an honorary doctorate (Doctor honoris causa) from the University of Copenhagen.

Early career
In 1996, he and his Spanish colleagues discovered that arthropods are monophyletic and that tardigrades are their sister group. In the same year, he, with the same group of authors, suggested that metazoan species are polymorphistic after he studied flatworm groups such as Dugesia, Seriata, Tricladida and Turbellaria. In 1999, he proposed to include Cycliophora as a sister group of Syndermata.

Later career
In 2001, with his colleagues from Australian Museum studied the systematics of some Arthropoda species.

In 2002, he and Ward Wheeler suggested that the molluscan bivalve group Anomalodesmata should be classless, and that the orders Myoida and Veneroida are not monophyletic.

The same year, he, Gregory Edgecombe, and their colleagues studied the phylogenetics of harvestmen, Opiliones, for 18s and 28s genes. Besides the genes, they also discovered that Dyspnoi and Laniatores formed the Dyspnolaniatores superfamily which should be used as new classification for Opiliones.

In 2006, he, along with Jon Mallatt, provided evidence that Branchiopoda not Malacostraca is the sister group of Hexapoda after studying ribosomal RNA in various phyla including Kinorhyncha and Ecdysozoa. The same year, he also participated at Harvard Museum of Natural History exhibit where he, Naomi Pierce, Brian D. Farrell, and E. O. Wilson showed species of whip scorpions and Sonoran Desert millipedes.

In 2007, he traveled to New Zealand in an attempt to find daddy longlegs spiders but did not find any there. In August 2007, he traveled to Florida, where he proved that harvestmen spiders found there are relatives of the West African ones, because when the supercontinent Pangea broke up the North American part took some of those species with it.

In 2009, he discovered the origin and evolution of animal organ systems by studying such bilaterian groups as Acoela and Nemertodermatida, which also proved that Acoelomorpha is not a sister group to them. During the same study he also suggested that the genus Xenoturbella is not a part of Deuterostoma super phylum, and that the genus Symbion and the Deuterostoma actually belong to the Bryzoa and Entoprocta subphyla.

In 2009, he and his students traveled to West Africa particularly to Cameroon and Gabon, where they collected velvet worms to compare them to the species found in Central, South America, and the Caribbean.

Personal life
Giribet participates in various Windsurfing championships, including the Spanish National Championship, the European Championship, and the World Championship.

Works

References

External links

Gonzalo Giribet: Harvard University faculty page

1970 births
Living people
Arachnologists
American arachnologists
Spanish zoologists
University of Barcelona alumni
Harvard University faculty
People from Barcelona
American malacologists
Myriapodologists
Members of the Institute for Catalan Studies